The Arkham Sampler was an American fantasy and horror fiction magazine first published in Winter 1948. The headquarters was in Sauk City, Wisconsin. The magazine, edited by August Derleth, was the first of two magazines published by Arkham House. It was published on a quarterly basis. The cover design was prepared by Ronald Clyne and was printed in alternating colors for the eight quarterly issues. Each issue had a print run of 1,200 copies with the exception of the Winter 1949 "All Science-Fiction Issue", of which 2,000 copies were printed. The Autumn 1949 issue was the last edition of the magazine.

The Arkham Sampler published fiction, poetry, reviews, letters, articles and bibliographic data. The magazine published original works by H. P. Lovecraft, Ray Bradbury, Robert E. Howard, Theodore Sturgeon, A. E. van Vogt, Robert Bloch and others. Other writers featured in the magazine include Anthony Boucher, Everett F. Bleiler, Martin Gardner, Carl Jacobi, David H. Keller, Fritz Leiber, Frank Belknap Long, E. Hoffmann Price, Vincent Starrett, Jules Verne and H. Russell Wakefield.

See also
 Science fiction magazine
 Fantasy fiction magazine
 Horror fiction magazine

References

Sources 
 
 
 
 

Quarterly magazines published in the United States
Defunct literary magazines published in the United States
Fantasy fiction magazines
Horror fiction magazines
Magazines established in 1948
Magazines disestablished in 1949
Magazines published in Wisconsin
H. P. Lovecraft